Manik Irani (also known as Billa) was an Indian actor, best known for playing villain roles in Bollywood films of the late 1980s and 1990s.

Filmography

References

External links

Male actors in Hindi cinema
Place of birth missing (living people)
20th-century Indian male actors
1953 births
Living people